Native American heritage sites are sites specifically created in many National Park Sites in the United States to commemorate the contribution of the Native American cultures.  The term ‘Native American’ includes all cultural groups that predate the arrival of either western European or East coast explorers and settlers.  In this sense, Native Alaskans of both arctic and sub-arctic cultures are included with the American Indians of the continental United States.  Native Hawaiians are included as the traditional cultures of the islands.

Many sites were created specifically to preserve the remains of cultures that no longer exist, such as Mesa Verde National Park or Russell Cave National Monument.  Some tell the story of a vibrant culture that continues to contribute to the American culture, as with Canyon de Chelly National Monument.  Yet others commemorate American Indian cultures that contributed to the development of an area, as Cape Cod National Seashore, or were a part of greater events in American history, such as Pea Ridge National Military Park.  The largest number preserve the historical contributions of the Native Cultures throughout time; included in these are Devils Tower National Monument, Pipestone National Monument, and Kaloko-Honokohau National Historical Park.

Parks

NPS units proposed but not confirmed as interpreting Native American culture(s) as a primary theme:

 Apostle Islands National Lakeshore, WI (Ojibwa)
 Arches National Park, UT (Paiute)
 Bering Land Bridge National Preserve, AK (Inupiaq and the St. Lawrence Island Yupik People)
 Canyonlands National Park, UT (Ute)
 Cape Krusenstern National Monument, AK (Inupiaq and the St. Lawrence Island Yupik People)
 Fort Laramie National Historic Site, WY (Cheyenne, Kiowa, Sioux)
 Gila Cliff Dwellings National Monument, NM
 Kobuk Valley National Park, AK (Inupiaq and the St. Lawrence Island Yupik People)
 Poverty Point National Monument, LA (Mississippian culture)

See also
 Federally recognized tribes
 (Federally) unrecognized tribes
 Native Americans in the United States
 List of Alaska Native tribal entities
 List of Indian reservations in the United States
 List of historical Indian reservations in the United States
 Outline of United States federal Indian law and policy
 State recognized tribes in the United States

References

National Historic Sites of the United States
National Park Service